Menotti is an Australian television series which screened in 1980–1981 on the ABC. It was created by Michael Craig and produced by John Croyston. It was written by Michael Jenkins, Peter Schreck, Robert Caswell, Michael Craig and Ted Roberts. It was directed by Julian Pringle, Frank Arnold, Russell Webb and Di Drew.

Cast
 Ivar Kants as Father Menotti
 Peter Gwynne as Father Donnelly
 Geoffrey Rush as Father Peter Fuller

See also 
 List of Australian television series

References

External links
 Menotti at IMDb
 Menotti at the Australian Television Information Archive

Australian adventure television series
1980 Australian television series debuts
Australian Broadcasting Corporation original programming